Kenny Passarelli (born October 28, 1949) is an American bass guitarist. Passarelli was a founding member of the Joe Walsh-led band Barnstorm, co-writing the hit "Rocky Mountain Way".  He later served as a contract player for a number of other acts, appearing in both session and live work.  These include stints with Elton John, Hall & Oates and Daryl Hall's solo work, Dan Fogelberg, Stephen Stills, Otis Taylor among others.

Career 
Born in Denver, Colorado to an Italian American family, Passarelli has played with a variety of rock musicians, including Joe Walsh, Elton John, Dan Fogelberg, Stephen Stills, Hall & Oates and Italian musician Edoardo Bennato. He served as a replacement for Dee Murray in the Elton John Band from 1975 to 1976, playing on the albums Rock of the Westies and Blue Moves. After leaving John's band he joined the Hall and Oates band in June 1977 and appeared on their albums Livetime and Along the Red Ledge.

Collaborations 
With Elton John
 Rock of the Westies (MCA, 1975)
 Blue Moves (Rocket, 1976)

With Bernie Taupin
 He Who Rides the Tiger (Elektra, 1980)

With Dan Fogelberg
 Souvenirs (Epic, 1974)
 The Innocent Age (Epic, 1981)
 Windows and Walls (Epic, 1984)

With Edoardo Bennato
 Non farti cadere le braccia (Ricordi, 1973)

With Eric Carmen
 Tonight You're Mine (Arista, 1980)

With Stephen Stills
 Stills (Columbia, 1975)
 The Live Album (Atlantic, 1975)

With Joe Walsh
 Barnstorm (ABC, 1972)
 The Smoker You Drink, the Player You Get (Dunhill, 1973)
 So What (Dunhill, 1974)
 There Goes the Neighborhood (Asylum, 1981)
 Analog Man (Fantasy, 2012)

With Yusuf Islam
 Roadsinger (Island Records, 2009)

With Daryl Hall
 Sacred Songs (RCA, 1980)

See also
List of bass guitarists

References

External links
Global Bass archives
Kenny Passarelli at Discogs.com

1949 births
Living people
American rock bass guitarists
American male bass guitarists
American session musicians
Musicians from Denver
Hall & Oates members
American people of Italian descent
Guitarists from Colorado
20th-century American bass guitarists
Barnstorm (band) members
20th-century British male musicians
20th-century British musicians
Elton John Band members